Jerusalem's ancient Armenian community experienced a major increase in numbers as survivors of the Armenian genocide perpetrated by the government of the Ottoman Empire beginning in 1915 found refuge in Jerusalem's Armenian Quarter.  The industry is believed to have been started by refugees from Kütahya, a city in western Anatolia noted for its  Iznik pottery.  The tiles decorate many of the city's most notable buildings, including the Rockefeller Museum, American Colony Hotel, and the House of the President of Israel.

David Ohannessian (1884–1953), who had established a pottery in Kütahya in 1907, is credited with establishing the Armenian ceramic craft industry in Jerusalem.  In 1911 Ohannessian was commissioned with installing Kütahya tile in the Yorkshire home of Mark Sykes.  In 1919 Ohannessian and his family fled the Armenian genocide, finding temporary refuge in Aleppo; they moved to Jerusalem when Sykes suggested that they might be able to replicate the broken and missing tiles on the Dome of the Rock, a building then in a decayed and neglected condition. Although the commission for the Dome of the Rock did not come through, the Ohannession pottery in Jerusalem succeeded, as did the Karakashian the painters and Balian the potters that Ohannessian brought with him from Kuttahya to help him with the project in 1919. After about 60 years new Armenian artists started to have their own studios.  

In 2019 the Israel Museum mounted a special exhibition of Jerusalem pottery in its Rockefeller Museum branch location.

Lower quality, mass-produced imitations of Armenian pottery produced in Arab cities and in China are popular with tourists, undercutting the carefully crafted, traditional pottery. A form of Palestinian Arab ceramics  similar in style is known as Hebron pottery.

See also
Israeli art

References

Further reading
The Armenian Ceramics of Jerusalem: Three Generations, 1919–2003, by Nurith Kenaan-Kedar, Yad Izhak Ben-Zvi books, 2003
The Armenian Pottery of Jerusalem, exhibition catalogue by Yael Olenik, Eretz Israel Museum, 1986
Feast of Ashes; The Life and Art of David Ohannessian, by Sato Moughalian (2019)

1915 establishments in the Ottoman Empire
Armenians in Jerusalem
Ceramics
Culture of Jerusalem
Arts & Crafts Productions